Jelle Troelstra (17 January 1891 – 16 January 1979) was a Dutch painter. His work was part of the painting event in the art competition at the 1928 Summer Olympics. Troelstra's work was included in the 1939 exhibition and sale Onze Kunst van Heden (Our Art of Today) at the Rijksmuseum in Amsterdam.

References

External links
images of Troelstra's art on Invaluable

1891 births
1979 deaths
20th-century Dutch painters
Dutch male painters
Olympic competitors in art competitions
People from Leeuwarden
20th-century Dutch male artists